Dark Rift is a 1997 fighting game developed for the Nintendo 64 console. The term may also refer to:
Great Rift (astronomy), a feature of the Milky Way Galaxy
Dark Rift, an album by Pictureplane
"Dark Rift", a song by God Is an Astronaut from the album Age of the Fifth Sun